Cycladic culture (also known as Cycladic civilisation or, chronologically, as Cycladic chronology) was a Bronze Age culture (c. 3200–c. 1050 BC) found throughout the islands of the Cyclades in the Aegean Sea. In chronological terms, it is a relative dating system for artifacts which broadly complement Helladic chronology (mainland Greece) and Minoan chronology (Crete) during the same period of time.

History

The significant Late Neolithic and Early Bronze Age Cycladic culture is best known for its schematic flat female idols carved out of the islands' pure white marble centuries before the great Middle Bronze Age ("Minoan") culture arose in Crete, to the south. These figures have been stolen from burials to satisfy the Cycladic antiquities market since the early 20th century. Only about 40% of the 1,400 figurines found are of known origin, since looters destroyed evidence of the rest.

A distinctive Neolithic culture amalgamating Anatolian and mainland Greek elements arose in the western Aegean before 4000 BC, based on emmer and wild-type barley, sheep and goats, pigs, and tuna that were apparently speared from small boats (Rutter). Excavated sites include Chalandriani, Phylakopi, Skarkos, Saliagos, Amorgos, Naxos and Kephala (on Kea), which showed signs of copper-working. Kea is the location of a Bronze Age settlement at the site now called Ayia Irini, which reached its height in the Late Minoan and Early Mycenaean eras (1600–1400 BC). The Mycenaean town of Naxos (around 1300 BC) covered the area from today's city to the islet of "Palatia", and part of it was discovered under the square, in front of the Orthodox Cathedral, in Chora, where the archaeological site of Grotta is located today.

Naxos has been continuously inhabited since at least the fourth millennium BC. Study of the island's toponyms asserts that Naxos has never been abandoned. Each of the small Cycladic islands could support no more than a few thousand people, though Late Cycladic boat models show that fifty oarsmen could be assembled from the scattered communities (Rutter). When the highly organized palace-culture of Crete arose, the islands faded into insignificance, with the exception of Kea, Naxos and Delos, the latter of which retained its archaic reputation as a sanctuary through the period of Classical Greek civilization (see Delian League).

The chronology of Cycladic civilization is divided into three major sequences: Early, Middle and Late Cycladic. The early period, beginning c. 3000 BC, segued into the archaeologically murkier Middle Cycladic c. 2500 BC. By the end of the Late Cycladic sequence (c. 2000 BC), there was essential convergence between the Cycladic and Minoan civilizations.

There is some disagreement between the dating systems used for Cycladic civilization, one "cultural" and one "chronological". Attempts to link them lead to varying combinations; the most common are outlined below:

Archaeology

The initial archaeological excavations of the 1880s were followed by systematic work by the British School at Athens and by Christos Tsountas, who investigated burial sites on several islands in 1898–99 and coined the term "Cycladic civilization". Interest then lagged, but picked up in the mid-20th century, as collectors competed for the modern-looking figures that seemed so similar to a sculpture by Jean Arp or Constantin Brâncuși. Sites were looted and a brisk trade in forgeries arose. The context for many of these Cycladic Figurines has thus been mostly destroyed; their meaning may never be completely understood.

Other mysterious discoveries include the Cycladic frying pans, whose original functions remain unknown.

Early Cycladic culture evolved in three phases, between c. 3300 and 2000 BC, when it was increasingly submerged in the rising influence of Minoan Crete.  Excavations at Knossos on Crete reveal an influence of Cycladic civilization upon Knossos in the period 3400 to 2000 BC as evidenced from pottery finds at Knossos.

See also
Cycladic art
Goulandris Museum of Cycladic Art
History of the Cyclades

References

Further reading

External links